This article is a list of notable Asian Australians.

Academia 

 Vanessa Woods, scientist, author
 Victor Chang, cardiac surgeon

Arts/architecture/design 

 Van Thanh Rudd

Business and industry 

 L. Janusz Hooker, chair of LJ Hooker
 Sir Leslie Joseph Hooker, founder of L.J. Hooker

Culinary 

 Adam Liaw, chef, media personality
 Luke Nguyen, chef

Entertainment

Actors and filmmakers 

 Anh Do, Australian author, actor, and comedian
 Anne Curtis, actress and model
 Anthony Brandon Wong, actor
 Bobby Morley, actor in Home and Away
 Dichen Lachman
 Gemma Pranita
 Jasmine Curtis, actress and model
 Jason Keng-Kwin Chan, Actor
 Jordan Rodrigues, actor and dancer known for Dance Academy
 Maria Tran, Vietnamese actress, filmmaker
 Natalie Tran, video blogger
 Shiori Kutsuna, actress
 Matthew Victor Pastor, film director

Music 

 Christian John Li, Australian young violinist
 Dami Im, singer-songwriter
 Guy Sebastian, Singer
 Mahalia Barnes, singer, daughter of Jimmy Barnes
 Jessica Mauboy, singer; actress (Indonesian father)
 John Williams, guitarist
 Kate Ceberano, singer
 Matt Hsu's Obscure Orchestra, musician, composer, multi-instrumentalist
 Rosé Park, Korean singer and model
 TwoSetViolin, violin duo

Fashion 

 Jenny Kee, fashion designer
 Jessica Gomes
 Nadya Hutagalung
 Samantha Downie
 Zinnia Kumar, model & scientist

Law 

 David Flint

Literature 

 Benjamin Law, writer
 Brian Castro, writer
 Hoa Pham, Writer
 Simone Lazaroo, writer

Military 

 Billy Sing, World War I soldier

Politics 

 Bill O'Chee, former Senator for (Qld) in Federal Parliament
 Christabel Chamarette
 David de Kretser, former Governor of Victoria
 Deepak Vinayak, Public figure from Melbourne
 Lisa Singh, former Tasmanian senator 
 Michael Johnson, former politician
 Penny Wong, Foreign Minister of Australia, Senator for (SA) in federal parliament

Sports 

 Adam Hollioake, Australian-born England international cricketer
 Alex Silvagni, Australian rules footballer
 Andrew Embley, Australian rules footballer
 Andrew Everingham
 Ashton Agar
 Ben Hollioake, Australian-born England international cricketer
 Catriona Bisset, middle-distance runner
 Chen Shaoliang, Australian rules footballer
 Clancee Pearce, Australian rules footballer
 Craig Wing, Rugby League player
 Daniel Kerr, Australian rules footballer
 Dannie Seow, Australian rules footballer
 Eddie Jones, rugby union player
 Eric Pearce, field hockey player
 Fred Pringle, Australian rules footballer
 Geoff Huegill
 Henry Smith, long jumper
 Iain Ramsay, soccer player
 Jason Day, golfer
 Jordan McMahon, Australian rules footballer
 Julian Pearce
 Kevin Gordon, rugby league player
 Lin Jong, Australian rules footballer
 Michael Letts, rugby player
 Nick Kyrgios, tennis player
 Paul Medhurst, Australian rules footballer
 Peter Bell, Australian rules footballer
 Rex Sellers
 Rhys Williams
 Richard Chee Quee, cricketer
 Roger Kerr
 Sam Kerr, international soccer player
 Sean Wroe, sprinter
 Stuart Clark, cricketer
 Trent Dennis-Lane, Australian rules footballer
 Usman Khawaja, cricketer
 Wally Koochew, Australian rules footballer

See also 

 List of Asian Australian politicians

Footnotes